South Thames Colleges Group (STCG) is a large further education institution operating four colleges in south-west London: South Thames College, Kingston College, Merton College, and Carshalton College. The four main campuses are in Wandsworth, Kingston upon Thames, Morden and Carshalton.

History
It was formed in 2017 following the merger between South Thames College and Merton College with Kingston College and Carshalton College.

South Thames College
South Thames College was founded in 1895.

South Thames College is the largest provider of post-16 study and training in the London Borough of Wandsworth

Carshalton College
Carshalton College opened as Carshalton Technical Institute in 1954. In 2012 it entered into a federation with Kingston College.

Merton College
Merton College has existed since around 1890. A new building was erected in 1971 with additional blocks in later years. It formerly occupied a site on Central Road in the borough, which was sold to Barratt Homes, a housing developer. Merton College merged with South Thames College in 2009.

It should not be confused with Merton Sixth Form College, a nearby separate institution that was formed in 1990 and later became Phoenix Sixth Form College before closing down.

Kingston College
The forerunner of this college was Kingston Technical College founded in 1899. It was divided in 1962, with the technical college part becoming Kingston University.

Notable alumni

Carshalton
  James Ash, musician
  Paul Burstow, politician
 Qubad Talabani, diplomat
 Plastician, musician
 Jacqueline Wilson, author

Kingston
 Edward Woodward (1930-2009), actor

South Thames
John Boyega attended South Thames, graduating in 2011.

Merton
 Kemi Badenoch, politician, attended Phoenix Sixth Form College

References

External links

Education in the London Borough of Merton
Education in the London Borough of Wandsworth
Education in the London Borough of Sutton
Education in the Royal Borough of Kingston upon Thames
Further education colleges in London
Further education colleges in the Collab Group
Buildings and structures in the London Borough of Sutton
Carshalton
1895 establishments in England
Educational institutions established in 1895